Herman Wright Cappelen (born 1967) is a Norwegian philosopher. He is currently the Chair Professor of Philosophy at the University of Hong Kong.

Biography 

Cappelen is the son of author and publisher Peder Wright Cappelen and actress Kari Simonsen. Cappelen received a BA in Philosophy, Politics, and Economics from the University of Oxford, Balliol College, in 1989. In 1996, Cappelen received his PhD from the University of California, Berkeley. The title of his dissertation was "The Metaphysics of Words and the Semantics of Quotation". His advisors were Charles Chihara, Stephen Neale, and John Searle.

Academic career 

Cappelen was previously a professor of philosophy at the University of Oslo and at the University of St Andrews in Scotland. He works primarily on philosophy of language and philosophical methodology and related areas in epistemology, philosophy of mind, and metaphysics.  In 2013, he became editor of the journal Inquiry: An Interdisciplinary Journal Of Philosophy

Since 2020, Cappelen has been Chair Professor of Philosophy at the University of Hong Kong. Prior to that, Cappelen was Professor at the University of Oslo, where he co-directed CSMN's ConceptLab., a project on conceptual engineering funded by a Toppforsk award from the Research Council of Norway. Prior to that, he was, since 2007, Professor and Arché chair at the University of St Andrews. He has previously held positions at Somerville College, Oxford, University of Oslo, and Vassar College. He has been the Director of the Arché Philosophical Research Centre and was co-investigator of two research projects funded by longterm AHRC grants: "Contextualism and Relativism" and "Intuitions and Philosophical Methodology". Cappelen was one of the original applicants for the research center Centre for the Study of Mind in Nature (Norwegian Centre of Excellence) at the University of Oslo. Cappelen has been a member of the Norwegian Academy of Science and Letters since 2008, a Permanent Member of the Institut International de philosophie, and a member of the Academia Europaea since 2018.

Work 

Cappelen's most influential work is the 2004 book, Insensitive Semantics (written with Ernest Lepore). The book defends a minimal role for context in semantics and advocates speech act pluralism. It is one of the most cited works in philosophy within the last 10 years.

In 2018, his monograph Fixing Language: An Essay On Conceptual Engineering was released. The first monograph on the topic, it surveys both historical and contemporary work on conceptual engineering, and presents a theory of its nature and limitations.

Cappelen has argued that the role of intuition in Western analytic philosophy is overstated.  His 2012 book, Philosophy without Intuitions, argues that intuition plays a minor role - or no role at all - in most modern philosophy, and the fear that intuition is widespread has been damaging.  His claim that the role of intuitions is overstated is controversial, and has been hotly debated.

Along with Josh Dever, Cappelen has argued that the notion of perspective is unimportant for the philosophy of language, thought, and action. Their 2013 book The Inessential Indexical argues that the phenomena which, for example, John Perry and David Lewis think show the importance of indexical representation of the self and time can be accounted for using resources already available in the philosophy of language and thought.

Cappelen has also authored, or co-authored, important books on the debate between contextualists and relativists (Relativism and Monadic Truth, with John Hawthorne), and on quotation (Language Turned on Itself with Ernest Lepore). Some of his papers co-written with Ernest Lepore are collected in Liberating Content.

Cappelen, along with Josh Dever, wrote a series of textbooks on philosophy of language, Context and Communication (2016), Puzzles Of Reference (2018), and Bad Language (2019),. Along with John Hawthorne and Tamar Gendler he coedited The Oxford Handbook Of Philosophical Methodology (2016). With David Plunkett and Alexis Burgess he co-edited Conceptual Engineering and Conceptual Ethics (2020), a collection of papers on the topic of conceptual engineering.

His monograph Making AI Intelligible, co-written with Josh Dever, is forthcoming with Oxford University Press in 2021.

Publications 

Monographs:

 Making AI Intelligible (with Josh Dever), Oxford University Press, 2021,  
 Fixing Language: An Essay On Conceptual Engineering, Oxford University Press, 2018,  
 The Inessential Indexical: On the Philosophical Insignificance of Perspective and the First Person (with Josh Dever), Oxford University Press, 2013,  
 Philosophy without Intuitions, Oxford University Press, 2012,  
 Relativism and Monadic Truth (with John Hawthorne), Oxford University Press, 2009, 978-0-19-956055-4 
 Language Turned on Itself: The Semantics and Pragmatics of Metalinguistic Discourse (with Ernest Lepore), Oxford University Press, 2007,  
 Insensitive Semantics: A Defense of Semantic Minimalism and Speech Act Pluralism (with Ernest Lepore), Wiley-Blackwell, 2004,  

Edited Volumes:

 Conceptual Engineering and Conceptual Ethics (with David Plunkett and Alexis Burgess), Oxford University Press, 2020, 
 The Oxford Handbook of Philosophical Methodology (with Tamar Szabo Gendler and John Hawthorne), Oxford University Press, 2016, 
 Assertion: New Philosophical Essays (with Jessica Brown), Oxford University Press, 2011,  

Textbooks:

 Bad Language (with Josh Dever), Oxford University Press, 2019, 
 Puzzles of Reference (with Josh Dever), Oxford University Press, 2018 
 Context and Communication (with Josh Dever), Oxford University Press, 2016, 

Collection of Papers:

 Liberating Content (with Ernie Lepore), Oxford University Press, 2015,

References

External links 
 Staff Homepage at the University of St Andrews
 Interview with 3AM Magazine
 Some papers

1967 births
Living people
20th-century Norwegian philosophers
21st-century Norwegian philosophers
Analytic philosophers
Philosophers of language
Alumni of Balliol College, Oxford
Academic staff of the University of Oslo
Fellows of Somerville College, Oxford
Academics of the University of St Andrews
Members of the Norwegian Academy of Science and Letters
Norwegian expatriates in the United Kingdom
Norwegian expatriates in the United States
Herman